The Armed Forces of Turkmenistan currently funds 2 high ranking educational institutions: The Military Academy of Turkmenistan and the Military Institute of the Ministry of Defense of Turkmenistan. Aside from those two schools, there are several military schools around the country, specializing in the training of personnel of a branches of service. In the early 1990s when the armed forces were rapidly being developed, many officers were trained in the Russian Federation's Ministry of Defense, while at least 300 officers were sent to schools in Turkey. On 3 October 1992, the Turkmen State University created the first Turkmen educational department. This article lists institutions of the Turkmen Armed Forces based on its respective agency and service branch.

Ministry of Defense

Military Academy of Turkmenistan
The Military Academy of Turkmenistan named after Oguz Han was established on February 16, 2007 in Ashgabat. It is designed as a joint service institution, with enrollment coming from all branches of the armed forces. Construction began under President Saparmurat Niyazov, with the main facility being built by French company Bouygues. The academy occupies a total of 14,000 square meters, with the Olympic Stadium being located to the right of the academy and an Olympic water complex standing to the academy's front. The building accommodates 1,100 cadets with fitness rooms, libraries, sports centers and modern classroom. The first graduation took place on 3 May 2013, at the Oguzhan Palace Complex.

Military Institute of the Ministry of Defense of Turkmenistan
The military institute specializes in job training for different military professions such as infantry, aviation and signals. The institute is housed inside the Ministry of Defense, which contains various activity sites that are open to cadets. The institute is divided into 3 secondary schools: the Berdimuhamed Annayev Specialized Military School in Ashgabat, the Alp Arslan Specialized Military School in Dashoguz and the Soltan Sanjar Specialized Military School in Mary. Up until early 2007, the title of rector of the institute belonged to the minister of defense.

Turkmen Naval Institute
In June 2010, it was announced that the State Security Council of Turkmenistan led by President Gurbanguly Berdimuhamedow had ordered the creation of a naval institute. It was officially opened by Berdimuhamedow on Navy Day in 2015. The institute is based in Turkmenbashy. In September 2014, over 100 cadets of the naval institute attended a training course organized by the OSCE on maritime border security and port management.

Ministry of Internal Affairs

Police Academy of Turkmenistan
The Police Academy of Turkmenistan named after Army General Niyazov was established on February 12, 1993 as the basis of the Ashgabat Special Secondary Police School, the Higher Police School of the Ministry of Internal Affairs. On February 19, 1998, it was renamed to its current name to honor then-President Saparmurat Niyazov. The academy conducts training in firefighting and law enforcement procedures. The academy has 5 faculties:

Law
Special institutions
Fire-technical
Internal Troops
Advanced training

Institute of the Ministry of Internal Affairs
On May 29, 2009, the Special Secondary School of the Police of the Ministry of Internal Affairs of Turkmenistan was established. On July 1, 2011, it was renamed to the Institute of the Ministry of Internal Affairs of Turkmenistan. It is currently the seniormost educational institution of the Turkmen interior ministry.

Other agencies

Turkmen State Border Service Institute
The State Border Service Institute is the most recently established educational institution in Turkmenistan, being founded in 2014. The institute specializes in the training of personnel of the State Border Service of Turkmenistan and the Turkmen Border Troops.

Turkmen National Security Institute
The MNB Institute specializes in the training of personnel of the Ministry for National Security of Turkmenistan.

Military education at civil institutions
The following is a list of universities in Turkmenistan that provide military education in specific facilities:

Turkmen State Medical University
Turkmen State University (limited at first)
Turkmen State Institute of Transport and Communications
Turkmen Polytechnic Institute

These military departments were established in April 2007 for the training reserve officers and nurses of civil defence. Specifically officers are trained in mobile and armored troops; engineer and chemical warfare troops; and signal specialization.  he military departments are designed as structural training subunits of civil higher education establishments, graduates of which receive the rank of reserve Lieutenant.

References 

Military of Turkmenistan
Universities in Turkmenistan
 
Military academies of the Soviet Union